Golapi Ekhon Traine ( - English name: The Endless Trail) is a Bangladeshi drama film based on the novel of Amjad Hossain Droupodi Ekhon Traine and directed by himself. The film is one of his "Golapi" film series. This film was released on September 5, 1978 and became popular and had positive critical receptions.

Plot
Mondol (A.T.M. Shamsuzzaman) is an influential person in the village. His son Milon (Farooque) likes the girl of a street singer (Anwar Hossain) Golapi (Bobita). In the meantime, Mondol brings a bridegroom for Golapi but they demand a cycle. Golapi's father cannot afford this so Milon pay for the cycle. But for some reason the marriage does not take place and Golapi's father commits suicide. As a result, Golapi's family fall into grief and she starts to work in different places by train. The people from the village do not take this positively and sit to desert them to work on trains.

Cast
 Bobita - Golapi
 Farooque - Milon
 Anwar Hossain - Golapi's Father
 Rosy Samad - Golapi's Mother
 Anwara - Moina
 Tarana Halim - Alapi
 Rawshan Jamil - Buri
 A.T.M. Shamsuzzaman - Mondol
 Abdullah al Mamun - Manik
 Teli Samad - Bonga

Soundtrack
The music of this film was directed by Alauddin Ali and lyrics were penned by Tahera Haque, Moniruzzaman Monir, Mohammad Moniruzzaman, Gazi Mazharul Anwar and Amjad Hossain. Syed Abdul Hadi, Sabina Yasmin and other popular singers sang in this film.

Awards
National Film Awards
Golapi Ekhon Traine made history winning 9 awards out of 16 including Best Film, Best Director, Best Music Director, Best Actor in a Supporting Role, Best Actress in a Supporting Role, Best Lyrics, Best Male Playback Singer, Best Screenplay and Best Cinematography (Color).
 Amjad Hossain made a unique record of achieving 4 National Awards in the same year including Best Film (Producer), Best Director, Best Screenplay and Best Lyricist.

References

External links
 
 Golapi Ekhon Traine at the Bangla Movie Database

1970 films
1970s war drama films
Golapi (film series)
Bangladeshi war drama films
Bengali-language Bangladeshi films
Best Film National Film Award (Bangladesh) winners
Films scored by Alauddin Ali
Films directed by Amjad Hossain
1970s Bengali-language films
1978 drama films
1978 films
Bangladesh Film Development Corporation films
Films whose writer won the Best Screenplay National Film Award (Bangladesh)